Scutiger nyingchiensis is a species of toad found in the Himalayas of southeastern Tibet (China), northwestern Nepal, and tentatively, Bhutan. There are no confirmed records from India; earlier records refer to Scutiger occidentalis or Scutiger spinosus. Its type locality is Nyingchi, Tibet. It is also known as the Nyingchi high altitude toad, Nyingchi alpine toad, or Nyingchi lazy toad.

Description
A medium-sized Scutiger, adult males of S. nyingchiensis measure  and adult females  in snout–vent length. Maxillary teeth are present. The toes are webbed. Males lack a vocal sac.

Habitat and conservation
Scutiger nyingchiensis, in the sense of including Scutiger occidentalis, is an alpine species associated with streams in moist, forested, and grassland habitats in hilly areas. Breeding takes place in low-gradient streams and pools. The eggs are laid under fallen logs or under stones, and the tadpoles continue their development over the winter. Scutiger nyingchiensis is locally common but potentially threatened by diversion of water from breeding streams for agricultural use and by water pollution associated with agrochemicals.

References

nyingchiensis
Amphibians of Bhutan
Frogs of China
Amphibians of Nepal
Fauna of Tibet
Amphibians described in 1977